Homer Caton (July 1, 1887 – November 25, 1958) was an American farmer and politician.

Born on a farm in Macon County, Illinois, Caton was a farmer and lived in Stanford, Illinois. He served on the McLean County Board of Supervisors and was president of the county board. He also served on the McLean County Board of Review. Caton served in the Illinois House of Representatives from 1937 to 1957. He then worked for the Illinois Highway Patrol. Caton died after suffering a stroke.

Notes

1887 births
1958 deaths
People from Macon County, Illinois
People from McLean County, Illinois
Farmers from Illinois
County board members in Illinois
Republican Party members of the Illinois House of Representatives
20th-century American politicians